Sonwad is a village of Panchayat system in Dharangaon tehsil Jalgaon district in the state of Maharashtra, India.

Villages in Jalgaon district